Alberta has provincial legislation allowing its municipalities to conduct municipal censuses. Municipalities choose to conduct their own censuses for multiple reasons such as to better inform municipal service planning and provision or to simply update their populations since the last federal census.

Alberta began the year of 2022 with 343 municipalities. Of these, at least three municipalities are conducting a municipal census in 2022, including the City of Cold Lake, the Town of High Level, and Strathcona County.

Municipal census results 
The following summarizes the results of the three municipal censuses conducted in 2022.

Breakdowns

Urban and rural service areas

Hamlets 
The following is a list of hamlet populations determined by the 2022 municipal census conducted by Strathcona County, excluding the Sherwood Park urban service area that is presented above.

See also 
List of communities in Alberta

Notes

References

External links 
Alberta Municipal Affairs
Statistics Canada
Statistics Canada: Census Program

Local government in Alberta
Municipal censuses in Alberta
2022 censuses
2022 in Alberta